Reece Millidge (born 1975) is a Brighton-based British Flash and mobile game developer, also known under the pseudonym Damp Gnat, which is also the name of his (one-man) studio. He is best known for the games Wonderputt, which was a finalist for the Independent Games Festival Excellence in Visual Art award, and Icycle. Millidge was named a "Breakthrough Brit" at the 2014 BAFTAs.

Life and career
Millidge's father was himself an independent game developer, releasing and self-publishing a single game for the BBC Micro in the 1980s, when Millidge was only 7 years old. Millidge was an early fan of video games, finding himself especially spellbound by the game Exile for the BBC Micro at the age of 13, which also inspired him to make his first own game together with a friend for the Amiga 500. The game was eventually released under the name Odyssey in 1995 by publisher Audiogenic for the Amiga 500/600/1200. A fan letter sent to Peter Irvin, the co-creator of Exile, led to some work at the studio Frontier Developments, where Millidge worked as an artist on the 32X game Darxide (1996).

After Darxide, Millidge worked as an advertising animator and would not return to video game development until 2009, with the release of the Flash game Icycle. That game was followed by Adverputt (2010) and the IGF Excellence in Visual Art finalist Wonderputt (2011). His latest release is the game Icycle: On Thin Ice (2013).

In 2016, Millidge joined BAFTA Crew, a program that aims to support career progression by connecting upcoming talent with their peers and established industry figures. He was also a jury member for the BAFTA The Ones To Watch Award in the same year.

Games

References

External links
 DAMP GNAT (official website)
 Reece Millidge on Twitter

Browser game developers
Video game artists
Video game designers
Indie video game developers
1975 births
Living people